"Whatever You Want" is a song recorded by American singer Pink from her seventh studio album Beautiful Trauma. Pink co-wrote the song with its producers, Max Martin and Shellback. The song impacted hot adult contemporary radio on June 4, 2018, as the fifth single from the album. The song reached the top 10 in Flanders and the top 40 in Hungary and Slovakia.

Release
On October 5, 2017, "Whatever You Want" was released as the second promotional single from the album with the first being the album's title track, which then became the album's second official single. The song debuted alongside the announcement of Beautiful Trauma World Tour and a documentary on Apple Music.

Music video
The music video for the song was premiered on Apple Music on March 1, 2018. It was released exclusively for Apple Music users and then released to the public the following day. The music video was directed and edited by Brad Comfort. It contains clips of Pink preparing for her Beautiful Trauma World Tour, clips from her performance at Super Bowl LII, and clips from her at the 2017 MTV Video Music Awards.

Critical reception
Ross McNeilage of MTV News called it "a classic Pink-fighting-for-love song" and "a gorgeous acoustic midtempo built with stunning harmonies that elevate the song to something much bigger than its laidback production". Madeline Roth of the same publication added that it is an "uplifting power ballad". Anna Gaca of Spin deemed the song "a middle-of-the-road ballad about holding out in a relationship that feels like a sinking ship". Elias Leight of Rolling Stone regarded the song as "a celebration of romantic resilience", and felt "strings swell grandly and ringing guitars signal renewed commitment". Mike Nied of Idolator described the song as "more of the punchy determination that we have come to expect from her music and is shaping up to be a nice addition to her discography".

Track listing
Remixes EP
 "Whatever You Want" (Faux Tales Remix) – 3:22
 "Whatever You Want" (FTampa Remix) – 3:57
 "Whatever You Want" (Embody Remix) – 3:53

Charts

Weekly charts

Year-end charts

Release history

Notes

References

2010s ballads
2017 songs
2018 singles
Pink (singer) songs
Songs written by Pink (singer)
Songs written by Max Martin
Songs written by Shellback (record producer)
Song recordings produced by Max Martin
Song recordings produced by Shellback (record producer)
RCA Records singles